The 21st Academy Awards were held on March 24, 1949, honoring the films of 1948. The ceremony was moved from the Shrine Auditorium to the Academy's own theater, primarily because the major Hollywood studios had withdrawn their financial support in order to address rumors that they had been trying to influence voters. This year marked the first time a non-Hollywood production (Laurence Olivier's Hamlet) won Best Picture, and the first time an individual (Olivier) directed himself in an Oscar-winning performance.

The Academy Award for Best Costume Design was introduced this year. Like Best Cinematography and Best Set Decoration, it was split into Color and Black & White categories.

John Huston directed his father, Walter Huston, to the Academy Award for Best Supporting Actor for his role as Howard in The Treasure of the Sierra Madre, a unique accomplishment. The Huston family won three Oscars that evening (John won for Best Director and Best Screenplay, both for the same film). Humphrey Bogart's lack of a nomination for Best Actor has been since considered one of the Academy's greatest slights.

Joan of Arc set a record by receiving seven nominations without being nominated for Best Picture; this stood until They Shoot Horses, Don't They? (1969) received nine nominations at the 42nd Academy Awards without one for Best Picture.

Hamlet became the fifth film to win Best Picture without a screenwriting nomination; the next to do so would be The Sound of Music at the 38th Academy Awards. Jane Wyman became the first performer since the silent era to win an Oscar for a performance with no lines; Johnny Belinda was the fourth film to receive nominations in all four acting categories.

I Remember Mama received four acting nominations but not one for Best Picture, tying the record set by My Man Godfrey in 1936. Two more films to date have tied this record: Othello (1965) and Doubt (2008).

Awards

Nominees were announced on February 10, 1949. Winners are listed first and highlighted in boldface.

Academy Honorary Awards
Sid Grauman "master showman, who raised the standard of exhibition of motion pictures".
Adolph Zukor "a man who has been called the father of the feature film in America, for his services to the industry over a period of forty years".
Walter Wanger "for distinguished service to the industry in adding to its moral stature in the world community by his production of the picture Joan of Arc".

Best Foreign Language Film
Monsieur Vincent (France)

Academy Juvenile Award
Ivan Jandl

Irving G. Thalberg Memorial Award
Jerry Wald

Scientific or Technical
Class II
 Victor Caccialanza, Maurice Ayers and the Paramount Studio Set Construction Department for the development and the application of "Paralite", a new lightweight plaster process for set construction
 Nick Kalten, Louis J. Witt and the Twentieth Century-Fox Studio Mechanical Effects Department for a process of preserving and flame-proofing foliage
Class III
 Marty Martin, Jack Lannon, Russell Shearman and the RKO Radio Studio Special Effects Department; A.J. Moran and the Warner Bros. Studio Electrical Department

Presenters
Ethel Barrymore (Presenter: Best Motion Picture)
Ann Blyth (Presenter: Best Sound Recording)
Frank Borzage (Presenter: Best Director)
Ronald Colman (Presenter: Best Actress)
Wendell Corey (Presenter: Best Film Editing)
Jeanne Crain (Presenter: Short Subject Awards)
Arlene Dahl (Presenter: Best Art Direction)
Glenn Ford (Presenter: Best Special Effects)
Ava Gardner (Presenter: Documentary Awards)
Kathryn Grayson (Presenter: Music Awards)
Edmund Gwenn (Presenter: Best Supporting Actress)
Jean Hersholt (Presenter: Honorary Awards)
Celeste Holm (Presenter: Best Supporting Actor)
Louis Jourdan (Presenter: Best Foreign Film)
Deborah Kerr (Presenter: Writing Awards)
George Murphy (Presenter: Scientific & Technical Awards)
Robert Ryan (Presenter: Best Cinematography)
Elizabeth Taylor (Presenter: Best Costume Design)
Loretta Young (Presenter: Best Actor)

Performers
Harry Babbitt and Gloria Wood ("The Woody Woodpecker Song")
Doris Day ("It's Magic" from Romance on the High Seas)
Gordon MacRae ("For Every Man There's a Woman" from Casbah)
Jane Russell ("Buttons and Bows" from The Paleface)
Jo Stafford ("This Is the Moment" from That Lady in Ermine)

Multiple nominations and awards

The following 15 films received multiple nominations:
 12 nominations: Johnny Belinda
 7 nominations: Hamlet and Joan of Arc
 6 nominations: The Snake Pit
 5 nominations: I Remember Mama and The Red Shoes
 4 nominations: The Search and The Treasure of the Sierra Madre
 3 nominations: The Naked City
 2 nominations: The Emperor Waltz, A Foreign Affair, Portrait of Jennie, Red River, Romance on the High Seas, and When My Baby Smiles at Me

The following five films received multiple awards:
 4 wins: Hamlet
 3 wins: The Treasure of the Sierra Madre
 2 wins: Joan of Arc, The Naked City, and The Red Shoes

See also
6th Golden Globe Awards
1948 in film
 1st Primetime Emmy Awards
 2nd British Academy Film Awards
 3rd Tony Awards

References

Academy Awards ceremonies
1948 film awards
1949 in Los Angeles
1949 in American cinema
March 1949 events in the United States